Aaha Kalyanam is a 2019 Tamil romantic comedy web series for Blacksheep, which was written and directed by Anand K. Kumar and features Narendra Prasath, Brigida and Teja Venkatesh in the lead roles. The series marked the maiden original from Blacksheep and released the first season through Blacksheep's sister channel Unakkennapaa. The season which consists of 15 episodes aired on 27 September 2019, and the season finale ended on 17 February 2020. Currently it is dubbed into telugu and telecasted by Aadhan Talkies.

Cast 
 Brigida Saga as Pavithra (Pavi Teacher)
 Narendra Prasath as Prasad
 Teja Venkatesh as Mithra

Episodes

Audience response 
The audience well-received the series and the character Pavi Teacher played by Brigida saga, whose dusky skin tone and typical next-door girl personality gained her massive popularity among netizens. Brigida also gained a large fan following on social media platforms. Thus, the season which consists 15 episodes had received more than a million views in YouTube. However, despite being praised, one of the particular sequence featuring a connection with the Malayalam film Premam was criticised by netizens. The series is also available on Blacksheep's OTT platform BS Value.

References 

Blacksheep original programming
Tamil-language web series
Tamil-language romantic comedy television series
2019 Tamil-language television series debuts
2020 Tamil-language television series endings